Impact Records was a California based record label run by CT Records creator, Tony Hilder in the 1960s. This label released some surf records by The Crestwoods, Dave Myers and The Surftones, The Ramblers and The New Breed and The Revels.
The Revels were known for the hits "Comanche" and "Intoxica".

Background
Formed in the 1960s, this Los Angeles-based record label was managed by Tony Hilder. Among other things, Impact Records served as an outlet for masters that Hilder couldn't get released on other labels. A good deal of the material released was from local aspiring artists and bands of the Los Angeles area. Dean Zook handled the radio promotion for the Midwest, working from his base in Denver.

The first release on the label was "Church Key" by The Revels. The song was the first release for the label and credited to The Revels with Barbara Adkins. The single was distributed nationally by Liberty Records but was issued under the banner of Impact to keep the identity of the label.  The Revels, a local Californian band who had been around since 1957 had 4 singles released on the label from 1960 to 1962 which included the single they were best known for "Church Key".

One album that was produced by Hilder and released on the Impact label  was called Shake! Shout! & Soul. The recording for the album was done live at Santa Monica's 2nd Annual Surf Fair. It featured Lil Ray, The Original Surfaris, Dave Myers and the Surftones, The New Dimensions, Steve Korey and The Virtue Four.

Artists

Shorty Bacon
In April, 1962, Billboard reported that the Shorty Bacon band was backing Beverly Mae Wilson on a record she was to cut a record for Impact. Shorty Bacon's own release on the label was in 1961 with "Ten Times The World" / "What's Wrong With You". The B side was co-written by him. Later, he had another single on the label with "Daniel Boone
" bw Walls Of Yuma". He had a recording history that went back to the 1950s and prior to his releases on Impact, he had records out on the Kelley, Mohawk and Ozark labels. A few years later he was playing with Rose Maddox. One of his later records "Stand Up Fool" did quite well and gained a degree of popularity in the early 1970s.

Rue Barclay
In 1962, Rue Barclay had a release with "I've Lost The Road" bw "Please Dear Won't You Stay" on the label. His history in recording went back to the late 1940s. His release was "I've Lost The Road" bw "Please Dear Won't You Stay". The following year Barclay appeared in a low budget film, The Skydivers.

The Cupons
The Cupons were a group who had their single released on Impact. One of the members was the sister-in-law of Anthony J. Hilder. His wife's sister. 
Robert Hafner co-wrote the song "Turn Him Down" with K.C. Reeth. It was previously recorded by Emmett Lord, and Rochell & the Candles Girl group, The Cupons released their version backed with "Be Your Love Tonight", credited to Materlyn And The Cupons. "Turn Her Down" would be included on the VA comp, Girls in the Garage, Vol. 6 which was released on vinyl in 2018.
The Cupons' version of the song would later inspire a cover by The Pussywillows, included on their 1988 Spring Fever! album A Japanese punk / garage girl group, MELLViNS recorded it for the B side of their 2015 single, "One Fine Day".

Little Ray Jimenez
Little Ray Jimenez had a single on the label in 1962 with "Shake! Shout! & Soul!" bw "Soul And Stomp!".

The Revels
San Luis Obispo group, The Revels started out in high school in the mid-1950s as Gil Serna and the Rockets. Their name was changed to The Revels after Norman Knowles took over as the band leader. Two songs that they are most known for are "Church Key" and "Comanche". "Church Key" was a hit for them in 1960. One of their following singles was "Intoxica" backed with "Tequila" which was released in 1961. Their 1961 song "Comanche", a  Robert Hafner composition was first released on Impact 7 in 1961. It has been featured in two film soundtracks.
It first appeared as the "Detoured Theme" in The Exiles. In later years, it was included along with several other surf music hits on the soundtrack of the 1994 film, Pulp Fiction.

Info on other releases
In 1964, Dr. W.S. McBirnie presented "The Great Debate of 1964" with topics titled The Rumford Act, Convergence, and Coexistence. A 7" 45 RPM single of this speech was released on Impact AU-4X / AU-4.

Catalogue

References

External links
 Surf Guitar 101 Tony Hilder

Record labels based in California